Chief Design Officer (CDO), or design executive officer (DEO), is a corporate title sometimes given to an executive in charge of an organization's design initiatives. The CDO is typically responsible for overseeing all design and innovation aspects of a company's products and services, including product design, architectural design, graphic design, user experience design, industrial design, and package design. They may also be responsible for aspects of advertising, marketing, and engineering.

The position has emerged only recently, with chief design officers taking on roles that may have previously been assumed by a chief marketing officer, chief product officer, chief brand officer or delegated to lower-ranking design executives.  As with many other CxO roles it does not necessarily mean the role reports to the CEO.  In some companies the title is in name only and does not actually mean the role holder is an executive.  Some companies - such as IBM have many CDOs as executives of major divisions within the corporation.

Chief Design Officers

References

Management occupations
D
Design occupations